Julien Yves Rémi López Baila (born 1 March 1992), better known as Julien López, is a professional footballer who plays as a half for Ligue 2 club Paris FC. Born in France, he is a former Algeria youth international.

Club career
A youth academy product of  Montpellier, López signed his first professional contract with Paris FC of the Ligue 2 in June 2017 after a couple successful season with Consolat.

López made his professional debut with Paris FC in a Ligue 2 2–1 win over Bourg-en-Bresse on 4 August 2017. His first professional goal was the winner for Paris in a 2–1 win Auxerre on 25 August 2017.

International career
López represented the Algeria U17s at the 2009 FIFA U-17 World Cup, making 2 appearances.

Personal life
López was born in France to a French father of partially Spanish origin and an Algerian mother. His younger brother, Maxime Lopez, is also a footballer who represents the Serie A club Sassuolo and is a former youth international for France.

References

External links
 
 
 
 
 Paris FC Profile
 Montpellier Profile

1992 births
Living people
Footballers from Marseille
Algerian footballers
Algeria youth international footballers
French footballers
Algerian people of Spanish descent
French sportspeople of Algerian descent
French people of Spanish descent
Association football wingers
Paris FC players
Championnat National 3 players
Championnat National players
Ligue 2 players